Camerons may refer to:

Queen's Own Cameron Highlanders
Camerons Brewery
 Camerons, a suburb of Greymouth, New Zealand

See also
 Cameron's (disambiguation)